Michael Ivanovich Karinski (1840–1917) was a Russian philosopher. His Classification of Inferences (1880) has been called "the most important single work in logical theory that nineteenth-century Russia produced."

Works
 Classification of Inferences, 1880

References

1840 births
1917 deaths
Russian philosophers
Russian logicians